Adele Röder or Adele Roder (born 1980 Dresden) is a German painter. She and fellow artist Kerstin Brätsch form the duo DAS INSTITUT. Röder's work is included in the collection of  the Museum of Modern Art, New York.

References

1980 births
Living people
21st-century German women artists
21st-century German painters